The New Labour Party (NLP) was a minor South African political party founded by Peter Marais via floor crossing legislation after he left the New National Party in some disrepute. The name was chosen to evoke the former Labour Party led by the Reverend Allan Hendrickse as an anti-apartheid Coloured party. The NLP sought to position itself as the political voice of Coloured people, particularly in the Western Cape Province, but without success. The party won only 0.09% of the vote in the 2004 nationwide election and 0.67% in the simultaneous election to the Western Cape legislature.

It did not contest the 2009 election, instead supporting the formation of a new party, the Christian Democratic Alliance (CDA), along with a number of other parties. The CDA failed to win a seat.

References

Labour parties
Political parties in South Africa created by floor crossing
Defunct political parties in South Africa
Political parties disestablished in 2009